The 1987–88 OHL season was the eighth season of the Ontario Hockey League. The OHL inaugurates the OHL Goaltender of the Year award. Fifteen teams each played 66 games. The Windsor Spitfires won the J. Ross Robertson Cup, defeating the Peterborough Petes.

Regular season

Final standings
Note: GP = Games played; W = Wins; L = Losses; T = Ties; GF = Goals for; GA = Goals against; PTS = Points; x = clinched playoff berth; y = clinched division title

Leyden Division

Emms Division

Scoring leaders

Playoffs

Division quarter-finals

Leyden Division

(1) Peterborough Petes vs. (6) Toronto Marlboros

(2) Ottawa 67's vs. (5) Oshawa Generals

(3) Cornwall Royals vs. (4) Belleville Bulls

Emms Division

(1) Windsor Compuware Spitfires vs. (6) Kitchener Rangers

(2) London Knights vs. (5) Sault Ste. Marie Greyhounds

(3) Hamilton Steelhawks vs. (4) North Bay Centennials

Division semi-finals

Leyden Division

(2) Ottawa 67's vs. (3) Cornwall Royals

Emms Division

(2) London Knights vs. (3) Hamilton Steelhawks

Division finals

Leyden Division

(1) Peterborough Petes vs. (2) Ottawa 67's

Emms Division

(1) Windsor Compuware Spitfires vs. (3) Hamilton Steelhawks

J. Ross Robertson Cup

(E1) Windsor Spitfires vs. (L1) Peterborough Petes

Awards

1988 OHL Priority Selection
The Kingston Raiders held the first overall pick in the 1988 Ontario Priority Selection and selected Drake Berehowsky from the Barrie Colts. Berehowsky was awarded the Jack Ferguson Award, awarded to the top pick in the draft.

Below are the players who were selected in the first round of the 1988 Ontario Hockey League Priority Selection.

See also
List of OHA Junior A standings
List of OHL seasons
1988 Memorial Cup
1988 NHL Entry Draft
1987 in sports
1988 in sports

References

HockeyDB

Ontario Hockey League seasons
OHL